María de Huerva is a municipality located in the province of Zaragoza, Aragon, Spain. According to the 2004 census the municipality has a population of 2,125 inhabitants.

María de Huerva is named after the Huerva River.

See also
Zaragoza Comarca
List of municipalities in Zaragoza

References

External links 

 María de Huerva - News and Services 
 Web de la Peña Zaragocista de María de Huerva

Municipalities in the Province of Zaragoza